Regulation of the telephone numbers in Serbia is under the responsibility of the Regulatory Agency of Electronic Communication and Mail Services (RATEL), independent from the government.  The country calling code of Serbia is +381. The country has an open telephone numbering plan, with most numbers consisting of a 2- or 3-digit calling code and a 6-7 digits of customer number.

Overview
The country calling code of Serbia is +381. Serbia and Montenegro received the code of +381 following the breakup of the Socialist Federal Republic of Yugoslavia in 1992 (which had +38 as country code). Montenegro switched to +382 after its independence in 2006, so +381 is now used only by Serbia.

An example for calling telephones in Belgrade, Serbia is as follows:

xxx xx xx (within Belgrade)
011 xxx xx xx (within Serbia)
+381 11 xxx xx xx (outside Serbia)

The international call prefix depends on the country being called from: for example, 00 for most European countries and 011 from North America. For domestic calls (within the country), 0 must be dialed before the area code.

For calls from Serbia, the prefix for international calls was 99, but was changed to 00 since 1 April 2008, in order to match the majority of Europe (e.g. for a United States number 00 1 ... should be dialed).

Landline telephony
Calling code areas in Serbia have been largely unchanged since the time of Socialist Federal Republic of Yugoslavia. As Socialist Republic of Serbia had been assigned codes starting with 1, 2 and 3, they were simply carried over by Serbia after the breakup.

Calling code areas:

Until 2013, Telekom Srbija had a monopoly on fixed telephony services. When the new regulation came in force, competition became allowed in this field as well, and other operators entered the market, using alternative communication infrastructure:
 Orion Telekom –  over CDMA
 SBB – over coaxial cable (cable TV infrastructure)
 Yettel Serbia –  offering services only to business customers

Mobile telephony
There are three active mobile operators in Serbia (without Kosovo):
 Mobile Telephony of Serbia, styled as mts – subsidiary of Telekom Srbija
 Yettel Serbia
 A1 Serbia

and three virtual mobile operators:
 SBB
 Globaltel 
 Vectone Mobile

The calling codes are assigned to the operators using the following scheme:

Calling codes in the table are assigned to new customers by the respective provider. However, since 2011 customers can change the operator and retain the old calling code (along with the rest of the phone number). Thus, calling codes do not necessarily reflect the operator. It is not possible, however, to transfer a mobile number to a land-based operator and vice versa.

Special codes 
The following special telephone numbers are valid across the country:

On 21 May 2012, 2-digit emergency numbers were replaced by 3-digit ones (i.e. 192, 193 and 194 instead of 92, 93 and 94). This also applied to 976 (becoming 1976), 985 (becoming  1985), 987 (becoming 1987) and 9860 (becoming 19 860). 112 redirects to 192 on mobile phones.

Kosovo

The dialing code for Kosovo is +383. This code is the property of the Republic of Serbia which it has given by ITU to Serbia for the needs of the geographical region Kosovo as a result of the 2013 Brussels Agreement signed by the governments of Serbia and Kosovo. Kosovo declared independence from Serbia in 2008, but retained the +381 calling code only for fixed telephony until 2016. Dialing code +383 started to be allocated on 15 December 2016.

Currently phone numbers are accessible through both +381 and +383 code.

Fixed-line telephony

Mobile telephony

Notes

References

External links 
Republic Telecommunication Agency (RATEL)

See also 
 Telecommunications in Serbia

Telecommunications in Serbia
Telephone numbers
Serbia